The 1600 class was a class of diesel locomotives built by English Electric, Rocklea for Queensland Railways between 1962 and 1964.

History
The 1600 class were built as branch line locomotives. Two contracts were let of which the first was for twelve with a follow on contract for another six. The first batch were delivered between December 1962 and June 1963, with the others arriving between October 1963 and January 1964. A lengthy delay occurred before delivery owing to the first four being over the design weight. This resulted in numbers 1604 and 1605 being the first to enter service. All others were delivered after the weight problem had been overcome. 

They were initially based at Alpha in Central West Queensland and at Roma in South west Queensland. They were also used for shunting at yards around the state. Soon afterwards, all the 1600s were based at Alpha. The 1620 Class followed on from the success of the 1600s, and were used in the central and northern areas of Qld.

The class was withdrawn in 1991.

Five have been preserved:
1603 at Central Queensland University Centre for Railway Engineering
1604 by the Bellarine Railway, Queenscliff, Victoria
1613 by the Longreach Powerhouse Museum
1614 by the Australian Railway Historical Society at the Archer Park Rail Museum, Rockhampton
1616 by the Queensland Pioneer Steam Railway, Ipswich

Status table of preserved locomotives

Gallery

References

Co-Co locomotives
Diesel locomotives of Queensland
English Electric locomotives
Queensland Rail locomotives
Railway locomotives introduced in 1962
Diesel-electric locomotives of Australia
3 ft 6 in gauge locomotives of Australia